Daniel Alberto Carou (born 27 June 1984) is an Argentine footballer.

Honours

Player
Atlanta
 Primera B Metropolitana (1): 2010–11

References
 Profile at BDFA 
 

1984 births
Living people
Argentine footballers
Argentine expatriate footballers
Arsenal de Sarandí footballers
Club Atlético Atlanta footballers
Ñublense footballers
Expatriate footballers in Chile
Association football midfielders
People from Río Negro Province
21st-century Argentine people